C. arborea may refer to:
 Careya arborea, the slow match tree, a tree species found in India
 Cojoba arborea, the algarrobo, ardillo, lorito, barba de jolote, iguano, quebracho, sang sang, tamarindo, tambrán, tuburús or Bahama sibicú, a tree species found in the Caribbean, Mexico and Central America
 Coriaria arborea, the tutu, a poisonous shrub species native to New Zealand
 Crataegus arborea, the Montgomery hawthorn, a plant species native to the eastern United States in North America

See also 
 Arborea (disambiguation)